Jean-Marie Joubert (9 May 1932 – 21 August 2014) was a French cyclist. He competed in the 4,000 metres team pursuit event at the 1952 Summer Olympics.

References

External links
 

1932 births
2014 deaths
French male cyclists
Olympic cyclists of France
Cyclists at the 1952 Summer Olympics
Sportspeople from Charente-Maritime
French track cyclists
Cyclists from Nouvelle-Aquitaine